Nokia is a town and a municipality on the banks of the Nokianvirta River (part of the Kokemäki River) in the region of Pirkanmaa, some  west of Tampere in Finland. The distance to Tampere Airport from Nokia is  using road connections when circling Lake Pyhäjärvi. Its neighboring municipalities are Hämeenkyrö, Pirkkala, Sastamala, Tampere, Vesilahti and Ylöjärvi.

Etymology and heraldry
The origin of the name Nokia is obscure. After the sable was hunted to extinction in Finland, the word was applied to any dark-coated fur animal, such as the marten, which are found in the area to this day. The sable is enshrined on the Nokia coat of arms. However, later research has appeared to indicate that sables never inhabited Finland in the first place, and the name  may actually refer to the beaver. The coat of arms was designed by Gustaf von Numers and was confirmed on October 25, 1951.

History

The first literary reference to Nokia is in a 1505 document, which mentions two farms Stoora och Lilla Nokia, Swedish for "Big and Little Nokia". The Nokia manor was formed out of these two farms. The area was a part of the Pirkkala parish.

Nokia was the setting of one of the largest battles in the Club War, a 1596 peasant uprising against feudal lords. The peasants, armed with clubs, took up residence in Nokia Manor and won several skirmishes against the feudal cavalry, but were decisively defeated by Klaus Fleming on 1–2 January 1597. Thousands of clubmen were slain and their leader Jaakko Ilkka, who had fled, was captured a few weeks later and executed. The Club War was the last major peasant revolt in Finland, and it permanently consolidated the hold of the nation-state. Much later, in the Finnish Civil War (1918), Nokia (along with neighbouring Tampere) was a stronghold for the Red Guards and saw some combat.

In 1922, Suur-Pirkkala was split into Pohjois- and Etelä-Pirkkala (Northern and Southern). Nokia used to reach out to the current heart of Tampere, as the Pispala area was part of Nokia (Pohjois-Pirkkala) until 1937. In 1938 Pohjois-Pirkkala was renamed Nokia while Etelä-Pirkkala became simply Pirkkala. Two municipalities have been consolidated with Nokia: Suoniemi in 1973 and Tottijärvi in 1976. Nokia was designated as a city in 1977.

Industrial history

The eponymous telecommunications giant Nokia was founded by Fredrik Idestam in 1865 as a pulp mill. The Finnish Rubber Works Ltd (Suomen Gummitehdas Oy) (founded 1898) set up a factory in Nokia in 1904. These two companies and the Cable Company Ltd (Kaapelitehdas Oy) amalgamated in 1967 forming Nokia Corporation. Different branches of this conglomerate were split into several companies or sold off around 1990. The rubber works still operate in Nokia as Nokian Tyres and the paper mill as Essity. See History of Nokia for further details.

The telecommunication company Nokia no longer has any operations in the city of Nokia. Despite the company having been founded in Nokia, the headquarters were moved to Espoo, and the main factories are in Salo, both nearly 200 kilometres south of Nokia. The only current presence of the company in the city is the Nokia mansion, which is sometimes used for private parties for the company's executive staff. The city has repeatedly been asked to commemorate the company it gave birth to, but it has always declined, on the grounds that mobile phones were never produced there.

Nokia does have engineering and design facilities 15 kilometres away in nearby Tampere.

Present

Today's Nokia is famous for its spa, factory shops, waterways, and events. Nokia also enjoys good road and air connections. The largest companies are AGCO Power, Nokian Tyres, Purso, Patria Aviation and Essity paper mill. From a religious perspective, Nokia is best known for the charismatic Nokia Revival which began in 1990. Nokia is also known for its own fast food cuisine, Kuuma koira. and as a home town of Nokian Brewery. Due to the closeness of Tampere studio facilities, Nokia has been also used as a filming location. For example, Eric Sykes' The Big Freeze and Finnish TV production Korpelan Kujanjuoksu have been prominently filmed there.

Demographics
The following graph shows the population development of the town since 1964.

Notable natives and residents
 Markku Aro – singer
 Marko Asell – Olympic wrestler
 Roope Hintz – ice hockey player
 Kikka – pop singer
 Otto Koivula – ice hockey player
 Toivo Kärki – composer, musician, producer and arranger was born in Pirkkala, in an area which is now Nokia
 Jari Niemi – football player
 Kari Peitsamo – musician
 Tapio Rautavaara – athlete, musician, and actor was born in Pirkkala, in an area which is now Nokia
 Elsa Rautee – poet
 Anssi Salmela – ice hockey player
 Sami Sandell – ice hockey player
 Juuso Välimäki – ice hockey player
 Sami Välimäki – professional golfer

Statistics

Distances to the other cities and towns
 Tampere – 
 Sastamala – 
 Hämeenlinna – 
 Pori – 
 Rauma – 
 Turku – 
 Helsinki – 
 Vaasa –

Twin towns – sister cities
Nokia is twinned with:

 Karlstad, Sweden
 Moss, Norway
 Horsens, Denmark
 Blönduós, Iceland

Gallery

See also
Finnish national road 11
Ikaalinen, another spa town in the Pirkanmaa region
Nokia railway station
Nokia water crisis
Siuro, a village in Nokia

Notes

References

External links

 Town of Nokia – Official Website
 

 
Cities and towns in Finland
Populated places established in 1922